= Electoral districts of the Florida House of Representatives =

The Electoral districts of the Florida House of Representatives are the districts where eligible voters residing in that area may make a vote for to elect a member of the lower house of the Florida Legislature. There are 120 electoral districts.
